Rydal is an unincorporated community in Republic County, Kansas, United States.  It is located between Belleville and Scandia at Co Rd 13 and U.S. Route 36 highway.

History
The post office in Rydal was discontinued in 1953.

Education
The community is served by Pike Valley USD 426 public school district.

References

Further reading

External links
 Republic County maps: Current, Historic, KDOT

Unincorporated communities in Republic County, Kansas
Unincorporated communities in Kansas